Robert Lamson Crowell (November 28, 1945 – September 12, 2020) was an American attorney and politician who served as the mayor of Carson City, Nevada, from 2009 to 2020. He was a member of the Democratic Party.

Early life and education 
Crowell was born in Tonopah, Nevada. He earned a Bachelor of Arts degree from Stanford University in 1967 and a Juris Doctor from the Hastings College of the Law in 1973.

Career 
Crowell served in the Vietnam War before retiring from the United States Navy as a captain.

He was elected as mayor of Carson City in 2008 and assumed office in January 2009. he ran unopposed in the 2012 election, guaranteeing his second, four-year term. Under Nevada state law, uncontested elections are not included on the ballot. Crowell also served as a member of the Colorado River Commission of Nevada.

Personal life 
Crowell's son Bradley Crowell, is a political advisor and government official. Bob Crowell died at a VA hospital in Reno, Nevada, on September 12, 2020, at age 74.

References

1945 births
2020 deaths
21st-century American politicians
Mayors of places in Nevada
Military personnel from Nevada
Nevada Democrats
Nevada lawyers
People from Tonopah, Nevada
Politicians from Carson City, Nevada
Stanford University alumni
University of California, Hastings College of the Law alumni